Ramree (also spelt Yanbye or Ranbre) is the main dialect of the Rakhine language spoken in southern Rakhine State of Burma (Myanmar), especially in the areas surrounding Ramree Island, the Awagyun Island and southern coastal regions in Bangladesh. Ramree language is also widely spoken along the western coastline of Irrawaddy Division.

References

See also
Burmese language
Burmese dialects

Languages of Myanmar
Burmese language
Tonal languages
Isolating languages